Hexagonia is a genus of ground beetles in the family Carabidae. There are more than 40 described species in Hexagonia, found in Asia and Africa.

Species
These 48 species belong to the genus Hexagonia:

 Hexagonia andrewesi Jedlicka, 1935  (Philippines)
 Hexagonia angustula Péringuey, 1904  (Africa)
 Hexagonia apicalis Schmidt-Goebel, 1846  (India and Myanmar)
 Hexagonia bencoulensis Pouillaude, 1914  (Indonesia)
 Hexagonia bicolor Mateu, 1958  (Madagascar)
 Hexagonia bilyi Baehr, 2012  (Australia)
 Hexagonia bowringii Schaum, 1863  (Malaysia)
 Hexagonia brazzai Alluaud, 1931  (Congo (Brazzaville))
 Hexagonia castanea Jedlicka, 1936  (Philippines)
 Hexagonia caurina Andrewes, 1935  (India, Laos, and Myanmar)
 Hexagonia cephalotes (Dejean, 1826)  (India)
 Hexagonia collarti Basilewsky, 1948  (Weest Africa)
 Hexagonia concolor Mateu, 1958  (Madagascar)
 Hexagonia cyclops (Matsumura, 1911)  (Japan, Taiwan, and temperate Asia)
 Hexagonia dohrni Andrewes, 1930  (Indonesia and Malaysia)
 Hexagonia elongata Dupuis, 1913  (Taiwan and temperate Asia)
 Hexagonia eucharis Alluaud, 1932  (the Democratic Republic of the Congo)
 Hexagonia fleutiauxi Dupuis, 1913  (Indomalaya)
 Hexagonia gracilis Pouillaude, 1914  (Indonesia)
 Hexagonia gressitti Darlington, 1971  (Indonesia and New Guinea)
 Hexagonia guineensis Alluaud, 1931  (West Africa)
 Hexagonia immaculata (Chaudoir, 1861)  (South Africa and Tanzania)
 Hexagonia insignis (Bates, 1883)  (East Asia)
 Hexagonia klapperichi Jedlicka, 1953  (China)
 Hexagonia longithorax (Wiedemann, 1823)  (Bangladesh, India, and Myanmar)
 Hexagonia lucasseni van de Poll, 1889  (Indonesia)
 Hexagonia major Burgeon, 1937  (Africa)
 Hexagonia natalensis (Chaudoir, 1861)  (Africa)
 Hexagonia nigrita van de Poll, 1889  (Asia)
 Hexagonia palauensis Darlington, 1970  (Indonesia)
 Hexagonia pallida Chaudoir, 1878  (Africa)
 Hexagonia papua Darlington, 1968  (New Guinea)
 Hexagonia praeusta (Chaudoir, 1861)  (South Africa)
 Hexagonia punctatostriata (LaFerté-Sénectère, 1849)  (Africa)
 Hexagonia queenslandica Baehr, 2012  (Australia)
 Hexagonia sauteri Dupuis, 1912  (Japan, Taiwan, and temperate Asia)
 Hexagonia scabricollis (Klug, 1834)  (Africa)
 Hexagonia seyrigi Jeannel, 1948  (Madagascar)
 Hexagonia spinigera Andrewes, 1941  (Indonesia)
 Hexagonia stenodes Andrewes, 1935  (Bangladesh and India)
 Hexagonia terminalis Gemminger & Harold, 1868  (Africa)
 Hexagonia terminata Kirby, 1825  (Indomalaya)
 Hexagonia treichi Alluaud, 1925  (Guinea and Ivory Coast)
 Hexagonia umtalina Péringuey, 1904  (Zimbabwe)
 Hexagonia uninotata Andrewes, 1935  (India)
 Hexagonia venusta Péringuey, 1904  (West Africa)
 Hexagonia watanabei Morita & Toyoda, 2002  (Japan)
 Hexagonia zumpti Liebke, 1939  (Cameroon)

References

Ctenodactylinae